Laila Peak is a mountain in Hushe Valley near Gondogoro Glacier in the Karakoram range. Laila Peak has a distinctive spear-like shape and its northwest face has a slope of 45 degrees in more than 1500 vertical metres.

It has been climbed by Simon Yates, among others. According to the local people in Hushe, Laila peak has been climbed only twice, a total of only seven people have summited.

It was climbed in winter for the first time by Spanish mountaineers Alex Txikon and José Fernandez, in February 2013.

The height of the Laila peak in Hushe Valley is controversial. Some believe it to be 6200 metres whereas some mention it as 6614 metres. In a Japanese mountaineering map by Tsuneo Miyamori (published in 2003), the height of Laila Peak is mentioned as 6096 metres.

First skiers and snowboarders on Laila Peak
In the summer of 2005, the first ever ski attempts on Laila Peak were made by Fredrik Ericsson and Jörgen Aamot from Scandinavian countries. Although they could not reach the summit, they skied down the North-West face of the peak. They described it as "one of the most amazing mountains they have ever seen, like a needle it points straight up in the sky".

Frederik and Jörgen reached the base camp of Laila Peak (4150 metres) on June 18, 2005, and they were at Camp1 (5000 metres) on June 22. They made their first attempt to summit on Friday, June 24. They started climbing from 5000 metres at 2:30 am and after seven hours of climbing when they were only 100 metres from the summit, they realized that it was too icy to continue, and started skiing down on the North-West face of Laila Peak towards Gondogoro Glacier.

The second group ever to attempt to ski the mountain was Paul Holding (UK), Brendan O'Sullivan (Ireland), Ed Blanchard Wrigglesworth (Spain) and Luca Pandolfi (Italy).  All were the first snowboarders (two on splitboards) on the mountain except for Ed Blanchard Wrigglesworth, who was on skis. They reached the col at 5,400m only to find that the whole left side of the face had avalanched down to rock while they were climbing from the south side, scuppering any attempts for that year. A full account of their story can be found here.

A further attempt to summit the Laila has been made in June 2016 by a completely Italian expedition composed by Zeno Cecon (Tarvisio - UD), Carlo Cosi (Padova), Enrico Mosetti (Gorizia) and Leonardo Comelli (Trieste). During an attempt to summit the peak the group decided to turn back due to the amount of snow 150m below the summit. During the ski descent, in a traverse Leonardo Comelli fell 400 meters to his death.

Permit
The mountain lies in a restricted zone, and non-Pakistani visitors must get a permit, hire a guide, and purchase accident insurance for the entire party.

See also 
 List of highest mountains on Earth
 List of mountains in Pakistan

References

External links 
 Fredrik Ericsson on Laila Peak
 EverestNews.com Article on Pakistan Ski Expedition, 2005
 SummitPost.org Article on Laila Peak
 Frederik Ericsson's Home Page
 Jorgen Aamot's Home Page
 Paul Holding's Home Page
 Northern Pakistan detailed placemarks in Google Earth

Mountains of Gilgit-Baltistan
Six-thousanders of the Karakoram